Aydın Örs (born 23 July 1946 in Ankara) is a Turkish former basketball coach and former head coach of Fenerbahçe. He started to play basketball in 1963. He played for DSİ Spor and Sekerspor also played for 35 times with the Turkish national basketball team.

He started to be Efes Pilsen youth level coach in 1981 then head-coach of Efes Pilsen SK in 1992. He won 20 cups in 29 years as a head-coach.

He was the head-coach of the Turkish national basketball team when they played in the final of EuroBasket 2001.

He was also the head coach of Efes Pilsen SK where he won couple of titles, as well as the third biggest cup of European basketball on clubs-level, the Korać Cup in 1996. When he was the head-coach of Efes Pilsen S.K. he was known as the architect of "death" zone defense

He also was the head coach of Fenerbahçe in 2007, where he earned another national title. His arguments with Will Solomon were notable as he benched the American basketball player after a few incidents.

Honors
 with Efes Pilsen
Korać Cup (1): 1996
 Turkish League (5): 1992, 1993, 1994, 1996, 1997
 Turkish Cup (3): 1994, 1996, 1997
 Turkish President's Cup (3): 1993, 1996, 1998
 Saporta Cup: 1993 (runner-up)
 Turkish Youth League: 4 times
 with Fenerbahçe 
 Turkish League (1) : 2007
 with National Team
EuroBasket 2001 final
 with National Youth Team
 Balkan Cup (2): 1986, 1992

References

1946 births
Living people
Anadolu Efes S.K. coaches
Basketbol Süper Ligi head coaches
Fenerbahçe basketball coaches
Turkey men's national basketball team coaches
Turkish basketball coaches
Turkish men's basketball players